The Bastard Executioner is an American historical fiction drama television series, created by Kurt Sutter, that aired on FX from September 15, 2015 to November 17, 2015. On November 18, 2015, Sutter announced that FX had cancelled the series after one season.

Overview
Set in early 14th century Wales, Wilkin Brattle, a Welsh knight in the army of King Edward I of England, is betrayed by an  Englishman with a lust for power who leaves him for dead. When Brattle is near death, a child apparition implores him to lay down his sword and follow the path of a different man.

Later in life, Brattle lives as a happily married peasant farmer in Wales, awaiting the birth of his child. His new life of peace is shattered by the unbearable taxes assessed on the peasants by "Baron" Erik Ventris, the man who had betrayed Brattle. Pressured by his fellow villagers, Brattle leads a raid on the Baron's tax collector, which provokes Ventris' revenge killing of all the women and children in Brattle's village, and the burning of that village.

Brattle's raiders battle with the Baron, ending in Ventris' death and the massacre of his troops. Revenge, however, is not complete, as the raiders want all the soldiers who slaughtered their kin to die by the sword.

Brattle assumes the identity of Gawain Maddox, a journeyman punisher (executioner) injected into the plot just moments before the Baron's death. Brattle, aka Maddox, enters Castle Ventris intending to identify the remaining murderers so his fellow raiders can exact revenge. However, castle intrigue traps Brattle in his new alias and disdainful profession, forcing him to lead a double life while trying to determine whether this new path is the one the apparition has chosen for him, or if he has been led astray.

The plot partially involves the fallout from the real-life Welsh revolt of 1294–95 against English rule, led by Madog ap Llywelyn.

Cast

Main cast
Lee Jones as Wilkin Brattle / Gawain Maddox the Executioner
Stephen Moyer as Chamberlain Milus Corbett
Flora Spencer-Longhurst as Baroness Lowry "Love" Aberffraw Ventris
Kurt Sutter as Ludwig Von Zettel, better known as The Dark Mute
Sam Spruell as Toran Prichard / Marshal the Soldier
Katey Sagal as Annora of the Alders
Darren Evans as Ash y Goedwig
Danny Sapani as Berber the Moor
Timothy V. Murphy as Father Ruskin, the manor priest
Sarah White as Isabel Kiffin, the Baroness' Lady In Waiting and childhood friend
Sarah Sweeny as Jessamy Maddox, Gawain Maddox's widow
Ethan Griffiths as Luca Maddox, Gawain and Jessamy Maddox's son
Elen Rhys as Petra Brattle, Wilkin Brattle's wife

Special guest stars
Brían F. O'Byrne as Baron Erik Ventris, lord of the fictional Barony of Ventrishire
Matthew Rhys as Gruffudd y Blaidd, known as "The Wolf"; the leader of a growing rebellion against corruption, an ally to Wilkin and his friends, and the Baroness' half-brother

Recurring/guest stars
Kyle Rees as Calo Caine
Richard Brake as Baron Edwin Pryce
Ed Sheeran as Sir Cormac
Alec Newman as Leon Tell
Francis Magee as Absolon
Scroobius Pip as Aiden
Tom Forbes as Piers Gaveston, 1st Earl of Cornwall
Trevor Sellers as Robinus, the Archdeacon of Windsor and commander of the Rosula soldiers
Ross O'Hennessy as Locke
James Rousseau as Denley
Tim McDonnell as Huxley
Llew Davies as Norton
Eloise Lovell Anderson as Clara
Sophie Lovell Anderson as Ramona
Matthieu Charneau as Frenchie

Episodes

Production
The Bastard Executioner, the first pilot for Imagine TV with FX Network, stemmed from an idea by Grazer: "I find the executioner to be an incredibly fascinating and provocative character", he said. "He deals with the highest order and the lowest order in the culture. It's about as morally complex a profession as you can imagine". Grazer pitched the idea to 20th Television chairmen Dana Walden and Gary Newman. The two, along with Fox21 president Bert Salke, suggested Sutter as writer. After meeting with Grazer and taking some time to contemplate the idea, Sutter built a whole world around it, and the pitch was taken to FX.

Sutter explained the writing process and obstacles for the show on his vlog: "It's sort of fun of jumping into completely different world, completely different time, completely different vernacular, it's a toughest thing for me right now with the pilot is the story is all broken on my board here but you know trying to find different rhythms of speech and vernacular". Sutter held his fans hostage who were eagerly waiting for his new project. "I'm not writing it on period speech just because there's no actual recording of what that vernacular sounded like with intonation and everything."

The series was announced in December 2013. Sutter began writing the scripts once the last episode of Sons of Anarchy had wrapped up in late 2014. He reported, Katey Sagal is "definitely...involved" in the series.

Paris Barclay, who directed 15 episodes of Sons of Anarchy, directed The Bastard Executioner pilot and was executive producer. Charles Murray, a writer/co-executive producer of the last two seasons of Sons of Anarchy,  was a writer/co-executive producer on The Bastard Executioner series. Nichole Beattie was another Sons of Anarchy alumna on The Bastard Executioner writing staff; she has also written extensively for AMC's The Walking Dead and Rubicon.

The Bastard Executioner was filmed in Wales, United Kingdom, and featured a mostly British cast.

Barclay left for the UK on January 2 to work on casting and location matters. Sutter stayed in the US to finalize the script. He joined Barclay a few days later in the United Kingdom. The draft of the pilot script was sent to the studio executives at FX on the 7th of January. During mid-January, Sutter and Barclay visited several possible shooting locations in Wales, including Caerphilly Castle and Fforest Fawr.

Filming began on 23, 2015. The show's producers spent 10 months considering locations in Wales with the help of the Welsh Government's Wales Screen service, which encourages film and television productions to use locations, crews, and facilities throughout Wales. The project was one of the first major productions to move into Pinewood Studios' new facility in Cardiff.

The set for the series, in the form of a medieval village with a small castle, was constructed to the west of Cardiff at Dragon International Film Studios in Llanilid.

On May 22, 2015,The Bastard Executioner was picked up for a 10-episode series for fall launch.

On November 18, 2015, Sutter announced that FX had cancelled the series.

Reception 
Reviews for The Bastard Executioner were polarized, with praise being directed toward the action sequences and acting, and criticism toward the writing, pacing, limited character development, and excessive violence. It holds a rating of 49% on the review aggregator website Rotten Tomatoes, based on 53 critics; the website's consensus reads: "Kurt Sutter's The Bastard Executioner doesn't want for dark thrills, but it unfortunately has more enthusiasm for brutality and gore than necessary narrative focus." Out of 37 reviews in Metacritic, the show holds a rating of 55.

References

External links
 

2010s American drama television series
2015 American television series debuts
2015 American television series endings
Costume drama television series
English-language television shows
FX Networks original programming
Serial drama television series
Television series set in the 14th century
Television series created by Kurt Sutter
Television series by 20th Century Fox Television
Television shows set in Wales
Television shows filmed in the United Kingdom
Television series by Imagine Entertainment